Bailu Township is a township under the administration of Ganxian District, Ganzhou, Jiangxi, China. , it has 13 villages under its administration.

References 

Township-level divisions of Jiangxi
Ganzhou